Pentti Punkari (born 12 January 1938) is a Finnish wrestler. He competed at the 1960 Summer Olympics and the 1964 Summer Olympics.

References

1938 births
Living people
Finnish male sport wrestlers
Olympic wrestlers of Finland
Wrestlers at the 1960 Summer Olympics
Wrestlers at the 1964 Summer Olympics